Myracrodruon is a genus of plants in the family Anacardiaceae. Species are native to South America (Argentina, Bolivia, Brazil and Paraguay).

Taxonomy
The genus name first appeared in 1862 in a publication by Francisco Freire Allemão and Manoel Allemão. , the International Plant Names Index attributes authorship of the genus to both individuals, whereas other sources use only the first.

Myracrodruon may also treated as a synonym of Astronium.

Species
, Plants of the World Online accepted two species:
Myracrodruon balansae (Engl.) Santin
Myracrodruon urundeuva Allemão

References

Anacardiaceae
Anacardiaceae genera